Fox Crime was an Italian pay television channel owned by Fox Networks Group Italy, dedicated to broadcast crime series.

A time-shift channel called Fox Crime +1, which broadcast the same programmes an hour later, was launched on 1 May 2007. On 1 June 2009, a HD simulcast called Fox Crime HD was launched. in November 2010, a second time-shift channel, Fox Crime +2, was introduced. On 1 July 2021, the channel closed.

Programming
The main staples were major American crime series, most of which could be seen on the channel, including many series from the Law & Order and CSI franchise. The channel also featured older cult series, British crime series and original Italian, French, and German productions.

Programmes shown include:
 Bull
 Columbo
 Criminal Minds
 CSI: Crime Scene Investigation
 CSI: Miami
 CSI: NY
 Derrick
 Death in Paradise
 Family Law
 Fast Forward
 Law & Order
 Law & Order: Criminal Intent
 Law & Order: SVU
 Law & Order UK
 Major Crimes 
 Midsomer Murders
 Murder, She Wrote
 N.C.I.S.
 N.C.I.S.: Los Angeles
 New Tricks
 Numb3rs
 Perry Mason
 Prime Suspect
 The Blacklist
 The Body Farm
 The Killing
 The Protector
 Unforgettable
 Without a Trace

References

Fox Networks Group
Italian-language television stations
Defunct television channels in Italy
Television channels and stations established in 2005
Television channels and stations disestablished in 2021
Former subsidiaries of The Walt Disney Company
2005 establishments in Italy
2021 disestablishments in Italy